Big Mack may refer to fictional characters:
The Apple Dumpling Gang Rides Again#Cast
Body Fever#Cast